Kabinga Jacus Pande (born 1952) is a Zambian politician. Pande was appointed to the position of foreign minister in August 2007, replacing Mundia Sikatana. Pande had previously been the tourism minister. He held the Foreign Minister portfolio until 2011 when his party the Movement for Multi-Party Democracy (MMD) was dislodged by the Patriotic Front (PF) and was succeeded by Chishimba Kambwili.

References

External links
 Sikatana dropped Zambia National Broadcasting Corporation, 23 August 2007

1952 births
Living people
Foreign Ministers of Zambia
Tourism ministers of Zambia
Environment ministers of Zambia
Science ministers of Zambia
Members of the National Assembly of Zambia